Half Moon Lake or Halfmoon Lake may refer to:

Lakes
In Canada
Half Moon Lake (Alberta), Canada
Half Moon Lake, Alberta, a hamlet and resort on the lake

In the United States
Half Moon Lake in Bossier Parish, Louisiana
 Half Moon Lake in Calhoun County, Arkansas
 Half Moon Lake in Desha County, Arkansas
 Half Moon Lake in Mississippi County, Arkansas
Halfmoon Lake (Florida)
Half Moon Lake (Berrien County, Michigan)
Half Moon Lake (Meeker County, Minnesota)
Halfmoon Lake (Barnstead, New Hampshire)
Half Moon Lake (Polk County, Wisconsin) a water body near Milltown, Wisconsin, United States